The Meadows at Grand Valley State University in Allendale, Michigan, is the home of the Grand Valley State Lakers men's and women's golf teams. The links-style championship course was designed by Michael John Hurdzan in 1994. The course has hosted six NCAA National Championships since its opening and will host the women's National Championship in the spring of 2011. The Meadows has been explained as "One of the first West Michigan golf courses classified as upscale," by Michigan Golf. The course is located on the northwest quadrant of GVSU's main Allendale campus.

Rankings
The course is ranked the 22nd best college golf course in the nation by Links Magazine.

Tournaments
The Meadows has played host to both NCAA and Michigan High School Athletic Association (MHSAA) tournaments.

References

External links
The Meadows at GVSU website

Golf clubs and courses in Michigan
College golf clubs and courses in the United States
Allendale, Michigan
Grand Valley State University
Golf clubs and courses designed by Michael Hurdzan
Sports venues in Ottawa County, Michigan
Sports venues completed in 1994
1994 establishments in Michigan